Andreas Schroeder (b. , West Germany 26 November 1946) is a German-born Canadian poet, novelist, and nonfiction writer who lives in the small town of Roberts Creek, British Columbia.

Career 
He is the author of some 23 books, including fiction, creative nonfiction, poetry, translations and criticism. For many years he appeared on the CBC radio show Basic Black as its "resident crookologist", presenting a segment on some of the world's most outrageous and humorous crimes and criminals.
He served a term as Chair of the Writers' Union of Canada (1976/77), at which time he took over the Union's crusade for Public Lending Right. When that program was finally achieved, in 1986, he became its founding Chair, and served as the Union's PLR representative on the Public Lending Right Commission until 2008. 
Schroeder teaches Creative Non-Fiction in the University of British Columbia's Creative Writing program, where he holds the Rogers Communications Chair in Creative Nonfiction. 
Schroeder has been shortlisted for a Governor-General's Award (Nonfiction: Shaking It Rough) in 1977, the Sealbooks First Novel Award (1984), an Arthur Ellis Award for Best Nonfiction (1997), The Stephen Leacock Award for Humor (1997) and the Malahat Review Novella competition (1998). He has won the OLA's Red Maple Award for Young Adult Nonfiction twice (2005; 2007), has received several National Magazine Awards, and won the Canadian Association of Journalists' "Best Investigative Journalism" award in 1990. He is a member of the New Democratic Party and describes himself as a "non-observant Mennonite".

He is married to Sharon Brown; the couple have two daughters.

Works

Poetry
The Ozone Minotaur – 1969
File of Uncertainties – 1971
Universe: The Burden of Performance is on the Rider – 1977

Non-Fiction
Shaking it Rough: A Prison Memoir – 1976
The Mennonites: A Pictorial History of their Lives in Canada – 1990
Carved From Wood – A History of Mission, BC. – 1991
Scams, Scandals, and Skulduggery – 1996
Cheats, Charlatans, and Chicanery – 1997
Fakes, Frauds, and Flimflammery – 1999
Scams! (Young Adult Nonfiction) – 2004
Thieves! (Young Adult Nonfiction) – 2005
 Auf der Flucht mit Mona Lisa. Von Meisterdieben und charmanten Schwindlern.. Transl. Walter Goidinger. Droemer Knaur, Munich 1998
Duped! (Young Adult Nonfiction – 2011
Robbers! (Young Adult Nonfiction) – 2012

Fiction
The Late Man – 1972
Toccata in 'D': A Micro Novel – 1984
Dust-Ship Glory – 1976
The Eleventh Commandment – 1990
Renovating Heaven – 2008

References

External links
 
theglobeandmail.com

1946 births
Living people
Canadian male novelists
20th-century Canadian poets
Canadian male poets
Canadian radio personalities
German emigrants to Canada
Writers from British Columbia
20th-century Canadian male writers
Canadian Mennonites
Mennonite writers
Mennonite poets